This page lists the winners and nominees for the NAACP Image Award for Outstanding Supporting Actress in a Drama Series. The award was first given during the 1996 ceremony. Since its inception, Loretta Devine holds the record for the most wins with five.

Winners and nominees
Winners are listed first and highlighted in bold.

1990s

2000s

2010s

2020s

Multiple wins and nominations

Wins

 5 wins
 Loretta Devine

 3 wins
 S. Epatha Merkerson

 2 wins
 Khandi Alexander
 Mary J. Blige
 Chandra Wilson
 Naturi Naughton

Nominations

 6 nominations
 S. Epatha Merkerson

 5 nominations
 Loretta Devine
 Pam Grier
 Lynn Whitfield
 Chandra Wilson
 Alfre Woodard

 4 nominations
 Khandi Alexander
 C. C. H. Pounder
 Gloria Reuben
 Susan Kelechi Watson

 3 nominations
 Vanessa Bell Calloway
 Diahann Carroll
 Lisa Nicole Carson
 Audra McDonald
 Archie Panjabi
 Naturi Naughton

 2 nominations
 Khandi Alexander
 Mary J. Blige
 Anna Deavere Smith
 Jasmine Guy
 Marianne Jean-Baptiste
 Tina Lifford
 Lucy Liu
 Anika Noni Rose
 Sonja Sohn
 Cicely Tyson

References

NAACP Image Awards
Television awards for Best Supporting Actress